SS Dordogne was a steam-powered oil tanker that served the French Navy. She was formerly a British merchant ship, SS San Isidoro, of the Eagle Oil Transport Company.

History
In 1912 Weetman Pearson, 1st Viscount Cowdray founded the Eagle Oil Transport Company to transport oil from his Mexican Eagle Petroleum Company's oilfields in Mexico to the United Kingdom. The company ordered a fleet of 20 tankers from British shipyards. They included the sister ships San Isidoro and San Onofre from Armstrong Whitworth at Hebburn on the River Tyne in north-east England.

The French government bought SS San Isidoro in the year she was launched and renamed her Dordogne. She was scuttled at Brest in the Fall of France on 18 June 1940.

References

Sources

World War I merchant ships of the United Kingdom
World War I naval ships of France
World War II naval ships of France
Ships built on the River Tyne
Ships built by Armstrong Whitworth
1914 ships
Maritime incidents in June 1940
Ships sunk with no fatalities